Samed Hakan Kılıç (born 28 January 1996) is a French professional footballer who plays as a central midfielder for Challenger Pro League club Virton. His surname is commonly spelt as Kilic by the French media.

Club career
In August 2021, Kılıç joined Championnat National club Chambly.

International career
He is a former France youth international having earned caps at under-16, under-17, under-18, and under-19 level.

Personal life
Kılıç's parents are from Niğde, Turkey.

References

External links
 
 
 
 
 

1996 births
Living people
Footballers from Seine-et-Marne
French footballers
French people of Turkish descent
Turkish footballers
Citizens of Turkey through descent
France youth international footballers
Association football midfielders
AJ Auxerre players
Samsunspor footballers
SO Cholet players
Turgutluspor footballers
FC Chambly Oise players
R.E. Virton players
Ligue 2 players
Championnat National players
Championnat National 2 players
Championnat National 3 players
TFF First League players
TFF Second League players
Challenger Pro League players
French expatriate footballers
Expatriate footballers in Belgium
French expatriate sportspeople in Belgium